The 57th Golden Horse Awards was held on November 21, 2020 at the Sun Yat-sen Memorial Hall in Taipei, Taiwan. Organized by the Taipei Golden Horse Film Festival Executive Committee, the awards honored the best in Chinese-language films of 2019 and 2020. The ceremony was televised by TTV.

In the news
Taipei Golden Horse Film Festival Executive Committee chief executive  attributed the lower number of films submitted to the 57th Golden Horse Awards to fewer submissions of short films, not primarily to a boycott announced by the government of the People's Republic of China in August 2019.

Winners and nominees

References

External links
 Official website of the Golden Horse Awards

57th
2020 film awards
2020 in Taiwan